There have been 16 captains of the New York Yankees, an American professional baseball franchise also known previously as the New York Highlanders. The position is currently held by Aaron Judge, who was named the new captain on December 21, 2022.  The most recent captain prior to Judge was Derek Jeter, who was named as the 15th officially recognized captain of the Yankees in 2003, and held the post until 2014.  In baseball, the captain formerly served as the on-field leader of the team, while the manager operated the team from the dugout.

The first captain officially recognized by the Yankees was Hal Chase, who served in the role from 1910 through 1912. Roger Peckinpaugh served as captain from 1914 through 1922, until he was traded to the Boston Red Sox. He was succeeded by Babe Ruth, who was quickly deposed as captain for climbing into the stands to confront a heckler. Everett Scott served as captain from 1922 through 1925. Ten years later, Lou Gehrig was named captain, serving for the remainder of his career. After the death of Gehrig, then manager Joe McCarthy declared that the Yankees would never have another captain. The position remained vacant until team owner George Steinbrenner named Thurman Munson as captain in 1976. Following Munson's death, Graig Nettles served as captain. Willie Randolph and Ron Guidry were named co-captains in 1986. Don Mattingly followed them as captain in 1991, serving until his retirement in 1995. Gehrig, Munson, Guidry, Mattingly and Jeter are the only team captains who spent their entire career with the Yankees. Jeter is the longest tenured captain in franchise history, the 2014 season being his 12th as team captain.

Howard W. Rosenberg, a baseball historian, found that the official count of Yankees captains failed to include Clark Griffith, the captain from 1903–1905, and Kid Elberfeld, the captain from 1906–1907, while manager Frank Chance may have served as captain in 1913. In addition, right after The New York Times reported Rosenberg's research in 2007, Society for American Baseball Research member Clifford Blau contacted him to say he had found Willie Keeler being called the team's captain in 1908 and 1909, research that Rosenberg has confirmed.

Captains

See also

New York Yankees all-time roster
List of New York Yankees coaches

References

External links
 
 

Captains
Sports captains